Nakota (or Nakoda or Nakona) is the endonym used by those Assiniboine Indigenous people in the US, and by the Stoney People, in Canada.

The Assiniboine branched off from the Great Sioux Nation (aka the Oceti Sakowin) long ago and moved further west from the original territory in the woodlands of what is now Minnesota into the northern and northwestern regions of Montana and North Dakota in the United States, and Manitoba, Saskatchewan, and Alberta in Canada. In each of the  Western Siouan language dialects, nakota, dakota and lakota all mean "friend".

Linguistic history
Historically, the tribes belonging to the Sioux nation have generally been classified into three large language groups:
 Lakota (anglicized as Teton), who form the westernmost group.
 Dakota, (Dakhótiyapi - Isáŋyathi anglicized as Santee) originally the easternmost group
 Nakota, originally the two central tribes of the Yankton and the Yanktonai, 

The Assiniboine separated from the Yankton-Yanktonai grouping at an early time. For a long time, very few scholars criticized this classification.

In 1978, Douglas R. Parks, A. Wesley Jones, David S. Rood, and Raymond J. DeMallie engaged in systematic linguistic research at the Sioux and Assiniboine reservations to establish the precise dialectology of the Sioux language. They ascertained that both the Santee and the Yankton/Yanktonai referred (and refer) to themselves by the autonym "Dakota." The name of Nakota (or Nakoda) was (and is) exclusive usage of the Assiniboine and of their Canadian relatives, the Stoney. The subsequent academic literature, however, especially if it is not produced by linguistic specialists, has seldom reflected Parks and DeMallie's work. The change cannot be regarded as a subsequent terminological regression caused by the fact that Yankton-Yanktonai people lived together with the Santee in the same reserves. 

Currently, the groups refer to themselves as follows in their mother tongues:
Dakota people – Dakota, Santee, Yankton and Yanktonai
Lakota people - Lakota or Teton Sioux
Nakota - the Nakoda people, the Assiniboine and the Stoney

Present trends
Recently the Assiniboine and, especially, the Stoney have begun to minimize the historic separation from the Dakota, claiming a shared identity with the broader Sioux Nation. This can be seen on Alberta's Stoney official Internet sites, for example, in the self-designation of the Alexis Nakota Sioux First Nation, or in the claim of the Nakoda people to their Sioux ancestry and the value of their native language:
"As descendants of the great Sioux nations, the Stoney tribal members of today prefer to conduct their conversation and tribal business in the Siouan mother tongue". Saskatchewan's Assiniboine and Stoney tribes also claim identification with the Sioux tradition.

The Assiniboine-Stoney tribes have supported recent "pan-Sioux" attempts to revive the native languages. Their representatives attend the annual "Lakota, Dakota, Nakota Language Summits." Since 2008, these have been sponsored by Tusweca Tiospaye (Dragonfly Community), the Lakota non-profit organization for the promotion and strengthening of the language. They promote a mission of "Uniting the Seven Council Fires to Save the Language".

Notes

Sources
 Curtis, Edward Sheriff, The North American Indian : being a series of volumes picturing and describing the Indians of the United States, and Alaska (written, illustrated, and published by Edward S. Curtis; edited by Frederick Webb Hodge), Seattle, E. S. Curtis [Cambridge, Mass. : The University Press], 1907–1930, 20 v. (Northwestern University)
 DeMallie, Raymond J., "Sioux until 1850"; in Raymond J. DeMallie (ed.), Handbook of North American Indians: Plains (Vol. 13, Part 2, p. 718–760), William C. Sturtevant (Gen. Ed.), Smithsonian Institution, Washington, D.C., 2001
 Guy E. Gibbon, The Sioux: the Dakota and Lakota nations, Malden, Blackwell Publishers, 2003
 Howard, James H., The Canadian Sioux, Lincoln, University of Nebraska Press, 1984
 Lewis, M. Paul (a cura di), 2009. Ethnologue: Languages of the World, Sixteenth edition, Tex.: SIL International. Online version: http://www.ethnologue.com/
 Palmer, Jessica D., The Dakota peoples: a history of the Dakota, Lakota, and Nakota through 1863. Jefferson: McFarland & Company, Inc., Publishers, 2008
 Parks, Douglas R., DeMallie, Raymond J., "Sioux, Assiniboine and Stoney Dialects: A Classification", Anthropological Linguistics, Special Issue, Florence M. Voegelin Memorial Volume, Vol. 34:1-4 (Spring - Winter, 1992), pp. 233-255  (accessible online at JSTORE.
 Parks, Douglas R. & Rankin, Robert L., "The Siouan languages", in Raymond J. DeMallie (ed.), Handbook of North American Indians: Plains (Vol. 13, Part 1, p. 94–114), William C. Sturtevant (gen. ed.), Smithsonian Institution, Washington, 2001.
 Christopher Westhorp, Pocket guide to native Americans, Salamander Books, Londra, 1993 – Italian edition consulted: Indiani. I Pellerossa Tribù per Tribù, Idealibri, Milan, 1993.

 
Nakoda (Stoney)
First Nations in Alberta
First Nations in Saskatchewan
Native American tribes in Montana
Plains tribes
Algonquian ethnonyms
Siouan peoples